Gervaise Tottenham Waldo-Sibthorp (1815 – 13 October 1861) was a British Conservative Party politician.

One of four children of Charles Sibthorp and Maria Ponsonby Tottenham, Waldo-Sibthorp married Louisa Amcotts and had two children: Montagu Richard and Coningsby Charles.

Waldo-Sibthorp was elected Conservative MP for Lincoln at a by-election in 1856—caused by the death of his father—and held the seat until his own death in 1861.

Family

References

External links
 

Conservative Party (UK) MPs for English constituencies
UK MPs 1852–1857
UK MPs 1857–1859
UK MPs 1859–1865
1815 births
1861 deaths